10/90 may refer to:

 Mullet (haircut)
 10/90, a production model for a television show